Andrés Antonio Romero Samaniego (born 11 May 1967) is a Chilean retired football defender who was capped seven times for the Chile national team between 1990 and 1991. A player of Universidad Católica, he made his debut for the national squad on 8 November 1990 in a friendly against Brazil.

External links
RSSSF

1967 births
Living people
Chilean footballers
Chile international footballers
Association football defenders
1991 Copa América players
Club Deportivo Universidad Católica footballers